Elaphromyia adatha is a species of tephritid or fruit flies in the genus Elaphromyia of the family Tephritidae.

Distribution
Congo, Zimbabwe, Mozambique, Botswana, South Africa.

References

Tephritinae
Insects described in 1849
Diptera of Africa